Venkata Rayar was an Indian administrator who served as the Diwan of Cochin kingdom from 1856 to 1860. He became Diwan in 1856 on the sudden death of the then Diwan, T. Sankara Warrier. He was highly unpopular for his repressive policies. Eventually, delegation of popular citizens from Cochin met the Governor of Madras and submitted a memorandum requesting his removal. On the orders of the Governor of Madras, the then king of Cochin removed Venkata Rayar and replaced him with T. Sankunni Menon.

References 

 

Indian civil servants
Year of birth missing
Year of death missing